Ali Auglah (born 11 March 2002), is an Australian professional soccer player who plays as a forward for Macarthur FC.

External links

References

2002 births
Living people
Australian soccer players
Association football forwards
Western Sydney Wanderers FC players
A-League Men players
National Premier Leagues players